Georg Brochmann (15 May 1894, Ullensvang – 5 January 1952) was a Norwegian journalist, writer of popular science and playwright, born in Hardanger. He was the most productive writer of popular science in Norway in the interwar period. Between 1916 and 1916, Brochmann wrote for the socialist newspaper Arbeiderbladet. He was a vice chairman of the Norwegian Authors' Union from 1938 to 1945. He was arrested by the German occupants and incarcerated at the Grini concentration camp from January to May 1945. From 1947 to his death in 1952, he was editor in chief of Sjømann.

References

1894 births
1952 deaths
People from Ullensvang
Norwegian male writers
Grini concentration camp survivors